The Well-Digger's Daughter is a 1940 French romantic comedy drama film directed by Marcel Pagnol.

Plot
Patricia, a peasant, becomes pregnant by Jacques, a military pilot from a local family. As war breaks out, Jacques serves in World War II, but his family refuses to support his child and likewise, Patricia's father expels her from her home. Patricia stays with her aunt and gives birth to a boy. After Jacques is reported killed in the war, both families wish to meet their new grandchild. Jacques is not dead, however; he returns and Patricia agrees to marry him.

Selected cast
Raimu as Pascal Amoretti
Fernandel as Félipe Rambert
Josette Day as Patricia Amoretti
Line Noro as Marie Mazel
Georges Grey as Jacques Mazel
Fernand Charpin as Monsieur Mazel
Milly Mathis as Nathalie
Clairette as Amanda Amoretti
Roberte Arnaud as Roberte Amoretti
Raymonde as Éléonore Amoretti

Reception
In the film's most famous scene, Patricia and Jacques' families and the rest of the village listen to Philippe Pétain's speech of 17 June 1940 announcing the need for an armistice in the Battle of France. Because of the scene La Fille du puisatier has been called the first "Vichy film". Most of the filming occurred before Pétain's speech on the defeat of the French Third Republic, the scene with the speech was added later.

French actor Daniel Auteuil wrote, directed, and starred in a remake of this film in 2011.

References

External links

 
Trailer of the movie

1940 films
1940s romantic comedy-drama films
French romantic comedy-drama films
French black-and-white films
1940s French-language films
Films directed by Marcel Pagnol
Films set on the home front during World War II
1940 comedy films
1940 drama films
1940s French films
French pregnancy films
1940s pregnancy films